Ardara Road Halt was a station which served Ardara in County Donegal, Ireland.

History

The station was opened by the Donegal Railway Company, and became part of the County Donegal Railways Joint Committee railways in 1906 when the original company was bought jointly by the Great Northern Railway of Ireland and the Northern Counties Committee.

This organisation ran the line until its closure.

References 

 
 

Disused railway stations in County Donegal
Railway stations opened in 1893
Railway stations closed in 1960